Hughtun Hector (born 16 October 1984) is a football player from Trinidad and Tobago. He currently plays for W Connection.

Club career
Hector began his career in the youth ranks of W Connection before making his professional debut with the senior squad in 2008. Since then he has been one of the top midfielders in Trinidad and Tobago. While with Connection he has helped the club in capturing two domestic cups and the 2009 CFU Club Championship. During Connection's title run in the 2009 CFU Club Championship Hector recorded a hat-trick in a 5–0 rout over Centre Bath Estate. He ended as the competitions second leading scorer with 5 goals. On July 30, 2009, he scored the equalizing goal for Connection in a 2–2 draw with New York Red Bulls in a 2009–10 CONCACAF Champions League match.

His play with Connection and Trinidad and Tobago helped Hector to draw the attention of several foreign clubs. During October 2010 he went on trial with Ukraine top flight club PFC Sevastopol. During March 2011 it was reported that Hector would go on trial with New York Red Bulls in hopes of a securing a contract with the Major League Soccer club. After spending two years at Sông Lam Nghệ An he signed for Hanoi T&T for the 2014 season.

International career
Hector is a member of the Trinidad and Tobago national team.

International goals

Scores and results list Trinidad and Tobago's goal tally first.

Honors

W Connection
CFU Club Championship Winner (1): 2009
First Citizens Cup: Winner (1): 2008
Trinidad and Tobago Goal Shield Winner (1): 2009

References

1984 births
Living people
Trinidad and Tobago footballers
W Connection F.C. players
Song Lam Nghe An FC players
TT Pro League players
Trinidad and Tobago expatriate sportspeople in Vietnam
Expatriate footballers in Vietnam
Trinidad and Tobago international footballers
Trinidad and Tobago expatriate footballers
2014 Caribbean Cup players
Association football midfielders